Kjørnes is a small village area in the municipality of Sogndal in Vestland county, Norway. Kjørnes is a suburb or bedroom community for the village of Sogndalsfjøra. The village area sits along Norwegian National Road 5 on the steep, forested, hill leading down to the shore of the fjord.

References

Villages in Vestland
Sogndal